Equisetum hyemale (commonly known as rough horsetail, scouring rush, scouringrush horsetail and, in South Africa, as snake grass) is a perennial herbaceous vascular plant in the horsetail family Equisetaceae. It is a native plant throughout the Holarctic Kingdom, found in North America, Europe, and northern Asia.

Distribution
In nature Equisetum hyemale grows in mesic (reliably moist) habitats, often in sandy or gravelly areas.

It is primarily found in wetlands, and in riparian zones of rivers and streams where it can withstand seasonal flooding.  It is also found around springs and seeps, and can indicate their presence when not flowing.  Other habitats include moist forest and woodland openings, lake and pond shores, ditches, and marshes and swamps.

Description
Equisetum hyemale has vertical jointed reed-like stalks of medium to dark green. The stems are seldom branched. The stems themselves have conspicuous ridges, which are impregnated with silica. This makes the ridges feel rough and harsh.

The tiny leaves are joined together around the stem, forming a narrow black-green band or sheath at each joint. Like other ferns and their relatives, the plant reproduces by spores and does not produce flowers or seeds.

The stems are generally deciduous in cold climates, and remain during winter in warmer climates. It forms dense spreading colonies, in full to partial sun.

Taxonomy
Linnaeus was the first to describe scouring rush with the binomial Equisetum hyemale in his Species Plantarum of 1753.

The subspecies Equisetum hyemale subsp. affine is endemic to North America.

Two Equisetum plants are sold commercially under the names Equisetum japonicum (barred horsetail) and Equisetum camtschatcense (Kamchatka horsetail). These are both types of E. hyemale var. hyemale, although they may also be listed as varieties of E. hyemale.

Uses

Domestic
The rough stems have been used to scour or clean pots, and used as sandpaper.

Boiled and dried Equisetum hyemale is used as traditional polishing material, similar to a fine grit sandpaper, in Japan.

Music

The stems are used to shape the reeds of reed instruments such as clarinets or saxophones.

Medicinal
Some Plateau Indian tribes boiled the stalks to produce a drink used as a diuretic and to  treat venereal disease.

It is used as a homeopathic remedy.

Cultivation
Equisetum hyemale cultivated as an ornamental plant, for use in contained garden beds and planters, and in pots. It is a popular "icon plant" in contemporary Modernist and Asian style garden design. Its tight verticality fits into narrow planting spaces between walkways and walls, and on small balconies.

It is also used as an accent plant in garden ponds and ornamental pools, and other landscape water features, planted in submerged pots.

The plant is sometimes sold in the nursery trade as "barred horsetail" or "Equisetum japonicum", but is different in appearance than Equisetum ramosissimum var. Japonicum.

Invasiveness
The plant spreads very aggressively by underground runners, reaching under/past pavements and garden walls. Root barriers or large sunken planters ease containment in the garden.

In South Africa and Australia, the plant is an invasive species of moist natural habitats.

References

USDA Plants Profile: Equisetum hyemale (scouringrush horsetail)
Flora of North America: Equisetum hyemale
Missouri Botanical Garden, Kemper Center for Home Gardening — Equisetum hyemale (scouring rush)
Floridata — Equisetum hyemale.

Further reading
Equisetum hyemale, IEA Paper 2018

hyemale
Plants described in 1753
Taxa named by Carl Linnaeus
Ferns of Asia
Ferns of Europe
Ferns of the Americas
Plants used in traditional Native American medicine